Miami Homestead General Aviation Airport  is a county-owned public-use airport in unincorporated Miami-Dade County, Florida, United States, located  northwest of the central business district of Homestead.

History
The airport was renamed from "Homestead General Aviation Airport" to "Miami Homestead General Aviation Airport" in December 2014 by the Miami-Dade County Commission.

Facilities and aircraft 
It has two asphalt paved runways: 18/36 is 3,999 by 100 feet (1,219 x 30 m) and 10/28 is 3,000 by 75 feet (913 x 23 m). It also has one turf runway: 9U/27U is 2,500 by 150 feet (762 x 46 m).

For the 12-month period ending June 18, 2002, the airport had 72,084 aircraft operations, an average of 197 per day: 70% general aviation, 1% air taxi and 1% military. At that time there were 64 aircraft based at this airport: 66% single-engine, 13% multi-engine, 19% ultralight, 3% helicopter and 43% glider

There is extensive glider activity due to the presence of Miami Gliders, a glider flight school, operating out of runway 9 turf. Homestead is also the home of Skydive Miami.

References

External links 

 Miami Homestead General Aviation Airport page
 

Airports in Miami-Dade County, Florida
Homestead, Florida